April 2013

See also

References

 04
April 2013 events in the United States